Monj may refer to:

 Monj, Chaharmahal and Bakhtiari
 Monj, Kohgiluyeh and Boyer-Ahmad
 Monj, Razavi Khorasan

See also
 
 Munj (disambiguation)